The Rodovia Presidente Castelo Branco (SP-280) is a tollway in the state of São Paulo, Brazil. It was first opened on Saturday, 10 November 1968, by, then, the Governor of the state of São Paulo, Abreu Sodré. The tollway name was given in memory of former military despot Field Marshal Humberto de Alencar Castelo Branco, who served as President of Brazil during the military dictatorship.

The tollway passes by several cities, including: Barueri, Santana de Parnaíba, São Roque, Sorocaba, Tatuí, Avaré and Águas de Santa Bárbara. Near Barueri and due to the large population of São Paulo, Rodovia Castelo Branco is one of the busiest and widest of Brazil's tollways.

Initially known as Rodovia do Oeste (Western Expressway), it was built in three phases. The first phase was during 1963 to 1968 (from the city of São Paulo to the city of Torre de Pedra, extending 170 km west). The second phase was during 1971, reaching the city limits of São Manuel and Avaré (another 58 km). The final and third phase, for 74 km, ended at highway SP-225, near the city of Santa Cruz do Rio Pardo. Travelers going to Ourinhos and the Northwest part of the State of Paraná often follow the Castelo Branco (SP-225) route.

The tollway is managed and maintained by a state concession to three private companies: SPVias, Rodovias das Colinas and ViaOeste.

System Castelo-Raposo
Together with the Raposo Tavares Highway (SP-270), it links the capital of São Paulo to the western interior of the state, known as the Castelo-Raposo System. It also allows access to the Midwest and North regions of Brazil and neighboring countries (Bolivia and Peru) by interconnecting with the Marechal Rondon Highway (SP-300), made by the João Hypólito Martins Highway (SP-209), which connects the Castle to the city of Botucatu. The Castle is also a route to the southern region of the country (western Paraná) and countries like Paraguay and Argentina.

The concessionaire CCR ViaOeste estimates that around 100 thousand vehicles will travel through the Castelo-Raposo System on a daily basis. The operation is monitored by the 78 cameras linked to the Concessionary's Operational Control Center (CCO) and also by the Integrated Control Center (CCI) of Artesp.

See also
 Highway system of São Paulo
 Brazilian Highway System

References

External links
 Official Brazilian governmental road maps for the State of São Paulo (in Portuguese)
 Road finder viewer for the state of São Paulo
 Camera viewer of Castelo Branco

Highways in São Paulo (state)